Lake Gossi, or Mare de Grossi, is a body of water near Gossi in the Cercle of Gourma-Rharous of the Tombouctou Region of Mali.
The lake is near to the town of Gossi. 

In 1990, with lower rainfall than usual, there was competition over use of the land between cattle grazers and harvesting of fonio grains. Cattle spent three quarters of their grazing time around the shores of the lake, or in depressions. 
In the dry season, the Tamasheq people of the region rely on the lake as an important source of water, their only alternative being pits and wells to reach groundwater that may be  underground.
The lake is home to a number of waterbird species.
As of 2009, the lake was sometimes visited by lone male elephants in January or February.

At the start of 1846 the forces of the Tuareg people of the Timbuktu area were surprised and defeated by a force of Fula lancers from the Massina Empire under Balobbo. As a result, for a period Timbuktu again came under the authority of Amadu II of Masina.

References
Citations

Sources

Tombouctou Region
Gossi